Joseph Clarke  (1819–1888) was a British Gothic Revival architect who practised in London, England.

Career

In 1839, Clarke exhibited an antiquarian drawing with the Oxford Society for Promoting the Study of Gothic Architecture. He was made an Associate of the Royal Institute of British Architects (RIBA) in 1841 and a Fellow of the RIBA in 1850. He became a member of the Ecclesiological Society in 1853. He served as Diocesan Surveyor to the sees of Canterbury and Rochester, and from 1871 to the see of St Albans. He was also Consultant Architect to the Charity Commissioners.

In 1852, Clarke published Schools and Schoolhouses: a series of Views, Plans, and Details, for Rural Parishes. In this he condemned the set of model plans issued by the Committee of Council on Education as "unsuitable in every way" and stressed the advantages of employing an architect for every new school, rather than relying on a standardised design:The plan should always be formed to the site, and reference had to local materials; the design of the school, again, should conform to the materials. Brick and stone each require their separate uses, and so their several applications. The book included plans of twelve schools he had built in Kent, Essex and Oxfordshire, at Monks Horton, Lydd, Little Bentley, Coggeshall, Clifton Hampton, Coopershall, Wellesborough, Brabourne, Boreham, Foxearth, Hatfield and Leigh (Essex).

He drew up ambitious plans for an extension to the House of Charity in Greek Street Soho, including a chapel, refectory, dormitories and cloisters. Only the chapel (begun 1862) was actually built.
His association with commissions in Oxfordshire make it possible that he was the "Joseph Clarke, esq., architect" who presented plans for restoring the gatehouse at Rye, the intended scene of the Rye House Plot, to the Oxford Architectural Society in May 1842.

Clarke exhibited at the Royal Academy between 1845 and 1870. The exhibition catalogues give his address as 1, Lincoln's Inn Fields, from 1845 to 1850; and 13, Stratford Place, thereafter.

He is buried on the eastern side of Highgate Cemetery.

Work

Buildings

St Mary and St Nicholas parish church, Littlemore, Oxfordshire: chancel and tower, 1848
St Mary's parish church, Garsington, Oxfordshire: restoration, 1849
St Paul's parish church, Culham, Oxfordshire: rebuilding, 1852
Culham College, Culham, Oxfordshire, 1852 (now the European School, Culham)
Gloucester and Bristol Diocesan Training Institution, Fishponds, Gloucestershire (in partnership with John Norton of London), 1852 (later St Matthias' College)
Holy Trinity parish church, Ardington, Berkshire (now Oxfordshire): tower and spire, 1856
St John the Baptist's parish church, Wateringbury, Kent: restoration and south aisle, 1856
St Alban's parish church, Rochdale, Lancashire, 1856 (demolished 1973)
St Mary's parish church, Slaugham, West Sussex: restoration, 1857–1860
St Mary the Virgin parish church, Farnham, Essex, 1858–59
St Stephen's parish church, Congleton, Cheshire, 1860
St Luke's parish church, Heywood, Lancashire, 1860–62
St James' parish church, Aston, Oxfordshire: restoration, 1862
St Mary's chapel of ease, Shifford, Oxfordshire, 1863
St John the Baptist parish church, Niton, Isle of Wight: new churchyard cross on 15th-century base, 1865
St Paul's parish church, Choppington, Northumberland, 1866
St Michael's parish church, Bishop's Stortford, Hertfordshire: alterations to chancel and ceilings, extension of north aisle, 1868–69
St Mary's parish church, Apsley, Hertfordshire, 1871.
St Peter's Church, Woodmansterne, Surrey, 1876–77
St Mary the Virgin parish church, Hillborough, for Reculver parish, 1876–78
Holy Trinity parish church, Beckenham, Kent 1878
All Saints' Friern Barnet, London, N20.
Holy Cross Church, Hoath, Kent: restoration, north aisle added, new roofs and north arcade, new fittings including font, pulpit and pews, 1866-1867

Writings

References

Sources

1819 births
1888 deaths
Burials at Highgate Cemetery
English ecclesiastical architects
Fellows of the Royal Institute of British Architects
Associates of the Royal Institute of British Architects
Gothic Revival architects
Year of birth uncertain